Leslie Thomas Hollis (23 May 1865 – 7 August 1898) was an Australian politician.

He was born in Goulburn to Henry Hollis, who was superintendent of Goulburn Hospital, and Julia Regan. He attended school locally and became a student teacher for four years before studying medicine at the University of Sydney. He received a Bachelor of Medicine and a Master of Surgery, and from 1890 was house surgeon of Sydney Hospital. He practised in Goulburn from 1891. In 1891 he was elected to the New South Wales Legislative Assembly as the Labor member for Goulburn. In 1893 he refused to sign the pledge for a binding Labor vote, and became associated with the Free Traders. He retired in 1898 and died at Goulburn, unmarried, shortly afterwards.

References

 

1865 births
1898 deaths
Members of the New South Wales Legislative Assembly
Australian Labor Party members of the Parliament of New South Wales
Free Trade Party politicians
University of Sydney alumni
19th-century Australian politicians